3i Group plc is a British multinational private equity and venture capital company based in London, England. 3i is listed on the London Stock Exchange and is a constituent of the FTSE 100 Index.

History
The company was formed in 1945, as the Industrial and Commercial Finance Corporation (ICFC), by the Bank of England and the major British banks to provide long-term investment funding for small and medium-sized enterprises.  Its foundation was inspired by the Macmillan Committee, and resulted from the recognition in the 1930s, given new impetus in the postwar era, that smaller businesses faced a gap in available corporate finance due to banks being unwilling to provide long-term capital and the companies being too small to raise capital from the public markets.

During the 1950s and 1960s, and particularly after 1959 when the shareholder banks allowed it to raise external funds, ICFC expanded significantly. In 1973 ICFC acquired Finance Corporation for Industry, a sister company also formed in 1945 which focused on finance for large companies, and was renamed Finance for Industry (FFI).  In the 1980s, FFI became a leading provider of finance for management buyouts, and expanded internationally.  In 1983 the company was renamed Investors in Industry, commonly known as 3i.

3i Group was created in 1987 when the banks sold off their stakes to form a public limited company.  In 1994 the company was floated on the London Stock Exchange with a market capitalisation of £1.5 billion.

Operations
3i invests in mid-market buyouts, growth capital (minority) and infrastructure. Sectors invested in are business and financial services, consumer, industrials and energy, and healthcare.

Current investments

Former investments

References

External links

Yahoo profile

 
Financial services companies established in 1945
British companies established in 1945
Financial services companies of the United Kingdom
Companies listed on the London Stock Exchange
Financial services companies based in London
Private equity firms of the United Kingdom
Venture capital firms of the United Kingdom